Enlightenment Through a Chemical Catalyst is the eighth studio album by Mentallo & The Fixer, released on January 19, 2007 by Alfa Matrix.

Reception
Marc Tater of Chain D.L.K. awarded Enlightenment Through a Chemical Catalyst four out of five stars and praised the album for "presenting the very own multi-layered and complex style Gary likes to create and is known for." Release Magazine gave the album eight out of ten, called the band "the sound of things to come" and said "oscillations run wildly through aural fields littered with rich textures and arrpegiations which begin and end in chaotically irrational patterns." I Die:You Die found the album to be a "mixed success", criticizing it's incoherence while saying "it's never boring certainly, and has some truly fantastic passages." Industrial Reviews gave the album three stars out of five and praised the dense complexity of the writing but noted that the melodic verve that former member Dwayne Dassing brought to the band's compositions is missing from the album. Terrorverlag commended the psychedelic and brutal composition structures and commented that the band rarely becomes dull.

Track listing

Personnel
Adapted from the Enlightenment Through a Chemical Catalyst liner notes.

Mentallo & The Fixer
 Gary Dassing (as Mentallo) – vocals, programming, producer, engineering, mixing, cover art, illustrations, photography

Additional performers
 John Bustamante – additional vocals (5)

Production and design
 Benoît Blanchart – design
 Dwayne Dassing (as The Fixer) – mastering, editing

Release history

References

External links 
 
 Enlightenment Through a Chemical Catalyst at Bandcamp
 Enlightenment Through a Chemical Catalyst at iTunes

2007 albums
Mentallo & The Fixer albums
Alfa Matrix albums